Codie Elaine Oliver is an American producer of television and film.  She is known for directing Black Love, which she co-created with her husband, Tommy Oliver.

Select works
1982 (2013; executive producer)
Destined (2016; producer)
Black Love (2017–present; co-creator, director and executive producer)

References

External links

Living people
American film producers
American women film producers
Year of birth missing (living people)
21st-century American women